This is a list of the bird species recorded in Luxembourg. The avifauna of Luxembourg include a total of 322 species, of which 6 have been introduced by humans. This list follows natur&ëmwelt asbl. - BirdLife Int. Luxembourg (www.naturemwelt.lu).

This list's taxonomic treatment (designation and sequence of orders, families and species) and nomenclature (English and scientific names) are those of The Clements Checklist of Birds of the World, 2022 edition.

The following tags have been used to highlight several categories. Not all species fall into one of these categories; those that do not are commonly occurring native species.

(I) Introduced - a species introduced to Luxembourg as a consequence, direct or indirect, of human actions
(A) Accidental - a species that rarely or accidentally occurs in Luxembourg, for which supporting descriptions are required by the Luxemburg Rarities Committee (Luxemburger Homologationskommission)

Ducks, geese, and waterfowl
Order: AnseriformesFamily: Anatidae

Anatidae includes the ducks and most duck-like waterfowl, such as geese and swans. These birds are adapted to an aquatic existence with webbed feet, flattened bills, and feathers that are excellent at shedding water due to an oily coating.

Bar-headed goose, Anser indicus (A)
Graylag goose, Anser anser
Greater white-fronted goose, Anser albifrons
Taiga bean-goose, Anser fabalis (A)	
Tundra bean-goose, Anser serrirostris	
Pink-footed goose, Anser brachyrhynchus (A)
Brant, Branta bernicla (A)
Barnacle goose, Branta leucopsis (A)
Canada goose, Branta canadensis (I)
Mute swan, Cygnus olor (I)
Tundra swan, Cygnus columbianus (A)
Whooper swan, Cygnus cygnus (A)
Egyptian goose, Alopochen aegyptiacus (I)
Common shelduck, Tadorna tadorna
Garganey, Spatula querquedula
Northern shoveler, Spatula clypeata
Gadwall, Mareca strepera
Eurasian wigeon, Mareca penelope
Mallard, Anas platyrhynchos
Northern pintail, Anas acuta
Green-winged teal, Anas crecca
Red-crested pochard, Netta rufina
Common pochard, Aythya ferina
Ring-necked duck, Aythya collaris (A)
Ferruginous duck, Aythya nyroca
Tufted duck, Aythya fuligula
Greater scaup, Aythya marila
Common eider, Somateria mollissima (A)
Velvet scoter, Melanitta fusca (A)
Common scoter, Melanitta nigra (A)
Long-tailed duck, Clangula hyemalis (A)
Common goldeneye, Bucephala clangula
Smew, Mergellus albellus
Common merganser, Mergus merganser
Red-breasted merganser, Mergus serrator (A)

Pheasants, grouse, and alliesOrder: GalliformesFamily: Phasianidae

The Phasianidae are a family of terrestrial birds. In general, they are plump (although they vary in size) and have broad, relatively short wings.

Common quail, Coturnix coturnix
Red-legged partridge, Alectoris rufa (A)
Ring-necked pheasant, Phasianus colchicus (I)
Gray partridge, Perdix perdix
Black grouse, Lyrurus tetrix (A)
Hazel grouse, Tetrastes bonasia

GrebesOrder: PodicipediformesFamily: Podicipedidae

Grebes are small to medium-large freshwater diving birds. They have lobed toes and are excellent swimmers and divers. However, they have their feet placed far back on the body, making them quite ungainly on land.

Little grebe, Tachybaptus ruficollis
Horned grebe, Podiceps auritus (A)
Red-necked grebe, Podiceps grisegena (A)
Great crested grebe, Podiceps cristatus
Eared grebe, Podiceps nigricollis (A)

Pigeons and dovesOrder: ColumbiformesFamily: Columbidae

Pigeons and doves are stout-bodied birds with short necks and short slender bills with a fleshy cere.

Rock pigeon, Columba livia (I)
Stock dove, Columba oenas
Common wood pigeon, Columba palumbus
European turtle dove, Streptopelia turtur
Eurasian collared dove, Streptopelia decaocto

BustardsOrder: OtidiformesFamily: Otididae

Bustards are large terrestrial birds mainly associated with dry open country and steppes in the Old World. They are omnivorous and nest on the ground. They walk steadily on strong legs and big toes, pecking for food as they go. They have long broad wings with "fingered" wingtips and striking patterns in flight. Many have interesting mating displays.

Great bustard, Otis tarda (A)
Little bustard, Tetrax tetrax (A)

CuckoosOrder: CuculiformesFamily: Cuculidae

The family Cuculidae includes cuckoos, roadrunners, and anis. These birds are of variable size with slender bodies, long tails, and strong legs.

Common cuckoo, Cuculus canorus

Nightjars and alliesOrder: CaprimulgiformesFamily: Caprimulgidae

Nightjars are medium-sized nocturnal birds that usually nest on the ground. They have long wings, short legs, and very short bills. Most have small feet, of little use for walking, and long pointed wings. Their soft plumage is camouflaged to resemble bark or leaves.

Eurasian nightjar, Caprimulgus europaeus

SwiftsOrder: CaprimulgiformesFamily: Apodidae

Swifts are small birds which spend the majority of their lives flying. These birds have very short legs and never settle voluntarily on the ground, perching instead only on vertical surfaces. Many swifts have long swept-back wings which resemble a crescent or boomerang.

Common swift, Apus apus

Rails, gallinules, and cootsOrder: GruiformesFamily: Rallidae

Rallidae is a large family of small to medium-sized birds which includes the rails, crakes, coots, and gallinules. Typically they inhabit dense vegetation in damp environments near lakes, swamps, or rivers. In general they are shy and secretive birds, making them difficult to observe. Most species have strong legs and long toes which are well adapted to soft uneven surfaces. They tend to have short, rounded wings and to be weak fliers.

Water rail, Rallus aquaticus
Corn crake, Crex crex
Spotted crake, Porzana porzana
Eurasian moorhen, Gallinula chloropus
Eurasian coot, Fulica atra
Little crake, Zapornia parva (A)
Baillon's crake, Zapornia pusilla (A)

CranesOrder: GruiformesFamily: Gruidae

Cranes are large, long-legged, and long-necked birds. Unlike the similar-looking but unrelated herons, cranes fly with necks outstretched, not pulled back. Most have elaborate and noisy courting displays or "dances".

Common crane, Grus grus

Thick-kneesOrder: CharadriiformesFamily: Burhinidae

The thick-knees are a group of waders found worldwide within the tropical zone, with some species also breeding in temperate Europe and Australia. They are medium to large waders with strong black or yellow-black bills, large yellow eyes, and cryptic plumage. Despite being classed as waders, most species have a preference for arid or semi-arid habitats.

Eurasian thick-knee, Burhinus oedicnemus (A)

Stilts and avocetsOrder: CharadriiformesFamily: Recurvirostridae

Recurvirostridae is a family of large wading birds which includes the avocets and stilts. The avocets have long legs and long up-curved bills. The stilts have extremely long legs and long, thin, straight bills.

Pied avocet, Recurvirostra avosetta

OystercatchersOrder: CharadriiformesFamily: Haematopodidae

The oystercatchers are large and noisy plover-like birds with strong bills used for smashing or prising open molluscs.

Eurasian oystercatcher, Haematopus ostralegus

Plovers and lapwingsOrder: CharadriiformesFamily: Charadriidae

The family Charadriidae includes the plovers, dotterels and lapwings. They are small to medium-sized birds with compact bodies, short, thick necks and long, usually pointed, wings. They are found in open country worldwide, mostly in habitats near water.

Black-bellied plover, Pluvialis squatarola (A)
European golden-plover, Pluvialis apricaria
Northern lapwing, Vanellus vanellus
Sociable lapwing, Vanellus vanellus (A)
Kentish plover, Charadrius alexendrinus (A)
Common ringed plover, Charadrius hiaticula
Little ringed plover, Charadrius dubius
Eurasian dotterel, Charadrius morinellus 

Sandpipers and alliesOrder: CharadriiformesFamily: Scolopacidae

Scolopacidae is a large diverse family of small to medium-sized shorebirds including the sandpipers, curlews, godwits, shanks, tattlers, woodcocks, snipes, dowitchers and phalaropes. The majority of these species eat small invertebrates picked out of the mud or soil. Variation in length of legs and bills enables multiple species to feed in the same habitat, particularly on the coast, without direct competition for food.

Whimbrel, Numenius phaeopus
Eurasian curlew, Numenius arquata
Bar-tailed godwit, Limosa lapponica (A)
Black-tailed godwit, Limosa limosa
Ruddy turnstone, Arenaria interpes (A)
Red knot, Calidris canutus
Ruff, Calidris pugnax
Curlew sandpiper, Calidris ferruginea
Temminck's stint, Calidris temminckii (A)
Sanderling, Calidris alba (A)
Dunlin, Calidris alpina
Little stint, Calidris minuta
Pectoral sandpiper, Calidris melanotos (A)
Jack snipe, Lymnocryptes minimus
Eurasian woodcock, Scolopax rusticola
Great snipe, Gallinago media (A)
Common snipe, Gallinago gallinago
Red-necked phalarope, Phalaropus lobatus (A)
Red phalarope, Phalaropus fulicarius (A)
Common sandpiper, Actitis hypoleucos
Green sandpiper, Tringa ochropus
Spotted redshank, Tringa erythropus
Common greenshank, Tringa nebularia
Marsh sandpiper, Tringa stagnatilis (A)
Wood sandpiper, Tringa glareola
Common redshank, Tringa totanus

Skuas and jaegersOrder: CharadriiformesFamily: Stercorariidae

The family Stercorariidae are, in general, medium to large birds, typically with grey or brown plumage, often with white markings on the wings. They nest on the ground in temperate and arctic regions and are long-distance migrants.

Great skua, Stercorarius skua (A)
Pomarine jaeger, Stercorarius pomarinus (A)
Parasitic jaeger, Stercorarius parasiticus (A)
Long-tailed jaeger, Stercorarius longicaudus (A)

Gulls, terns, and skimmersOrder: CharadriiformesFamily: Laridae

Laridae is a family of medium to large seabirds, the gulls, terns, and skimmers. Gulls are typically grey or white, often with black markings on the head or wings. They have stout, longish bills and webbed feet. Terns are a group of generally medium to large seabirds typically with grey or white plumage, often with black markings on the head. Most terns hunt fish by diving but some pick insects off the surface of fresh water. Terns are generally long-lived birds, with several species known to live in excess of 30 years.

Black-legged kittiwake, Rissa tridactyla (A)
Sabine's gull, Xema sabini (A)
Black-headed gull, Chroicocephalus ridibundus
Little gull, Hydrocoloeus minutus
Mediterranean gull, Ichthyaetus melanocephalus
Common gull, Larus canus
Herring gull, Larus argentatus 
Yellow-legged gull, Larus michahellis (A)
Caspian gull, Larus cachinnans (A)
Lesser black-backed gull, Larus fuscus (A)
Great black-backed gull, Larus marinus 
Little tern, Sternula albifrons (A)
Gull-billed tern, Gelochelidon nilotica (A)
Caspian tern, Hydroprogne caspia (A)
Black tern, Chlidonias niger
White-winged tern, Chlidonias leucopterus (A)
Whiskered tern, Chlidonias hybrida (A)
Common tern, Sterna hirundo
Arctic tern, Sterna paradisaea (A)
Sandwich tern, Thalasseus sandvicensis 

LoonsOrder: GaviiformesFamily: Gaviidae

Loons, known as divers in Europe, are a group of aquatic birds found in many parts of North America and northern Europe. They are the size of a large duck or small goose, which they somewhat resemble when swimming, but to which they are completely unrelated.

Red-throated loon, Gavia stellata (A)
Arctic loon, Gavia arctica (A)
Common loon, Gavia immer (A)

Northern storm-petrelsOrder: ProcellariiformesFamily: Hydrobatidae

The northern storm-petrels are relatives of the petrels and are the smallest seabirds. They feed on planktonic crustaceans and small fish picked from the surface, typically while hovering. The flight is fluttering and sometimes bat-like.

Leach's storm-petrel, Hydrobates leucorhous (A)

StorksOrder: CiconiiformesFamily: Ciconiidae

Storks are large, long-legged, long-necked, wading birds with long, stout bills. Storks are mute, but bill-clattering is an important mode of communication at the nest. Their nests can be large and may be reused for many years. Many species are migratory.

Black stork, Ciconia nigra
White stork, Ciconia ciconia

Boobies and gannetsOrder: SuliformesFamily: Sulidae

The sulids comprise the gannets and boobies. Both groups are medium to large coastal seabirds that plunge-dive for fish.

Northern gannet, Morus bassanus (A)

Cormorants and shagsOrder: SuliformesFamily: Phalacrocoracidae

Phalacrocoracidae is a family of medium to large coastal, fish-eating seabirds that includes cormorants and shags. Plumage colouration varies, with the majority having mainly dark plumage, some species being black-and-white and a few being colourful.

Great cormorant, Phalacrocorax carbo
European shag, Gulosus aristotelis (A)

Herons, egrets, and bitternsOrder: PelecaniformesFamily: Ardeidae

The family Ardeidae contains the bitterns, herons and egrets. Herons and egrets are medium to large wading birds with long necks and legs. Bitterns tend to be shorter necked and more wary. Members of Ardeidae fly with their necks retracted, unlike other long-necked birds such as storks, ibises and spoonbills.

Great bittern, Botaurus stellaris
Little bittern, Ixobrychus minutus
Grey heron, Ardea cinerea
Purple heron, Ardea purpurea
Great egret, Ardea alba
Little egret, Egretta garzetta
Cattle egret, Bubulcus ibis
Squacco heron, Ardeola ralloides (A)
Black-crowned night-heron, Nycticorax nycticorax

Ibises and spoonbillsOrder: PelecaniformesFamily: Threskiornithidae

Threskiornithidae is a family of large terrestrial and wading birds which includes the ibises and spoonbills. They have long, broad wings with 11 primary and about 20 secondary feathers. They are strong fliers and despite their size and weight, very capable soarers.

Glossy ibis, Plegadis falcinellus (A)
Eurasian spoonbill, Platalea leucorodia (A)

OspreyOrder: AccipitriformesFamily: Pandionidae

The family Pandionidae contains only one species, the osprey. The osprey is a medium-large raptor which is a specialist fish-eater with a worldwide distribution.

Osprey, Pandion haliaetus

Hawks, eagles, and kitesOrder: AccipitriformesFamily: Accipitridae

Accipitridae is a family of birds of prey, which includes hawks, eagles, kites, harriers and Old World vultures. These birds have powerful hooked beaks for tearing flesh from their prey, strong legs, powerful talons and keen eyesight.

Black-winged kite, Elanus caeruleus (A)
Egyptian vulture, Neophron percnopterus (A)
European honey-buzzard, Pernis apivoris
Cinereous vulture, Aegypius monachus (A)
Eurasian griffon, Gyps fulvus (A)
Short-toed snake-eagle, Circaetus gallicus (A)
Greater spotted eagle, Clanga clanga (A)
Booted eagle, Hieraaetus pennatus (A)
Imperial eagle, Aquila heliaca (A)
Bonelli's eagle, Aquila fasciata (A)
Eurasian marsh-harrier, Circus aeruginosus
Hen harrier, Circus cyaneus
Pallid harrier, Circus macrourus (A)
Montagu's harrier, Circus pygargus
Eurasian sparrowhawk, Accipiter nisus
Northern goshawk, Accipiter gentilis
Red kite, Milvus milvus
Black kite, Milvus migrans
White-tailed eagle, Haliaeetus albicilla (A)
Rough-legged hawk, Buteo lagopus (A)
Common buzzard, Buteo buteo

Barn-owlsOrder: StrigiformesFamily: Tytonidae

Barn-owls are medium to large owls with large heads and characteristic heart-shaped faces. They have long strong legs with powerful talons.

Barn owl, Tyto alba

OwlsOrder: StrigiformesFamily: Strigidae

The typical owls are small to large solitary nocturnal birds of prey. They have large forward-facing eyes and ears, a hawk-like beak and a conspicuous circle of feathers around each eye called a facial disk.

Eurasian scops-owl, Otus scops (A)
Eurasian eagle-owl, Bubo bubo
Snowy owl, Bubo scandiacus (A)
Northern hawk owl, Surnia ulula (A)
Little owl, Athene noctua
Tawny owl, Strix aluco
Long-eared owl, Asio otus
Short-eared owl, Asio flammeus
Boreal owl, Aegolius funereus

HoopoesOrder: BucerotiformesFamily: Upupidae

Hoopoes have black, white and orangey-pink colouring with a large erectile crest on their head.

Eurasian hoopoe, Upupa epops

KingfishersOrder: CoraciiformesFamily: Alcedinidae

Kingfishers are medium-sized birds with large heads, long, pointed bills, short legs and stubby tails.

Common kingfisher, Alcedo atthis

Bee-eatersOrder: CoraciiformesFamily: Meropidae

The bee-eaters are a group of near passerine birds in the family Meropidae. Most species are found in Africa but others occur in southern Europe, Madagascar, Australia and New Guinea. They are characterised by richly coloured plumage, slender bodies and usually elongated central tail feathers. All are colourful and have long downturned bills and pointed wings, which give them a swallow-like appearance when seen from afar.

European bee-eater, Merops apiaster

RollersOrder: CoraciiformesFamily: Coraciidae

Rollers resemble crows in size and build, but are more closely related to the kingfishers and bee-eaters. They share the colourful appearance of those groups with blues and browns predominating. The two inner front toes are connected, but the outer toe is not.

European roller, Coracias garrulus (A)

WoodpeckersOrder: PiciformesFamily: Picidae

Woodpeckers are small to medium-sized birds with chisel-like beaks, short legs, stiff tails and long tongues used for capturing insects. Some species have feet with two toes pointing forward and two backward, while several species have only three toes. Many woodpeckers have the habit of tapping noisily on tree trunks with their beaks.

Eurasian wryneck, Jynx torquilla
Middle spotted woodpecker, Dendrocoptes medius
Great spotted woodpecker, Dendrocopos major
Lesser spotted woodpecker, Dryobates minor
Grey-headed woodpecker, Picus canus
Eurasian green woodpecker, Picus viridis
Black woodpecker, Dryocopus martius

Falcons and caracarasOrder: FalconiformesFamily: Falconidae

Falconidae is a family of diurnal birds of prey. They differ from hawks, eagles, and kites in that they kill with their beaks instead of their talons.

Eurasian kestrel, Falco tinnunculus
Red-footed falcon, Falco vespertinus (A)
Merlin, Falco columbarius
Eurasian hobby, Falco subbuteo
Peregrine falcon, Falco peregrinus

Old world parrotsOrder: PsittaciformesFamily: Psittaculidae

Characteristic features of parrots include a strong curved bill, an upright stance, strong legs, and clawed zygodactyl feet. Many parrots are vividly coloured, and some are multi-coloured. Old World parrots are found from Africa east across south and southeast Asia and Oceania to Australia and New Zealand.
 
Rose-ringed parakeet, Psittacula krameri (I)

Old World oriolesOrder: PasseriformesFamily: Oriolidae

The Old World orioles are colourful passerine birds. They are not related to the New World orioles.

Eurasian golden oriole, Oriolus oriolus

ShrikesOrder: PasseriformesFamily: Laniidae

Shrikes are passerine birds known for their habit of catching other birds and small animals and impaling the uneaten portions of their bodies on thorns. A typical shrike's beak is hooked, like a bird of prey.

Red-backed shrike, Lanius collurio
Great grey shrike, Lanius excubitor
Lesser grey shrike, Lanius minor (A)
Woodchat shrike, Lanius senator

Crows, jays, and magpiesOrder: PasseriformesFamily: Corvidae

The family Corvidae includes crows, ravens, jays, choughs, magpies, treepies, nutcrackers, and ground jays. Corvids are above average in size among the Passeriformes, and some of the larger species show high levels of intelligence.

Eurasian jay, Garrulus glandarius
Eurasian magpie, Pica pica
Eurasian nutcracker, Nucifraga caryocatactes
Eurasian jackdaw, Corvus monedula
Rook, Corvus frugilegus
Carrion crow, Corvus corone
Hooded crow, Corvus cornix (A)
Common raven, Corvus corax

Tits, chickadees, and titmiceOrder: PasseriformesFamily: Paridae

The Paridae are mainly small stocky woodland species with short stout bills. Some have crests. They are adaptable birds, with a mixed diet including seeds and insects.

Coal tit, Periparus ater
Crested tit, Lophophanes cristatus
Marsh tit, Poecile palustris
Willow tit, Poecile montanus
Eurasian blue tit, Cyanistes caeruleus
Great tit, Parus major

Penduline-titsOrder: PasseriformesFamily: Remizidae

The penduline tits are a group of small passerine birds related to the true tits. They are insectivores.

Eurasian penduline-tit, Remiz pendulinus

LarksOrder: PasseriformesFamily: Alaudidae

Larks are small terrestrial birds with often extravagant songs and display flights. Most larks are fairly dull in appearance. Their food is insects and seeds. T

Horned lark, Eremophila alpestris (A)
Calandra lark, Melanocoripha calandra (A)
Wood lark, Lullula arborea
Eurasian skylark, Alauda arvensis
Crested lark, Galerida cristata (A)

Bearded reedlingOrder: PasseriformesFamily: Panuridae

This species, the only one in its family, is found in reed beds throughout temperate Europe and Asia.

Bearded reedling, Panurus biarmicus

Reed warblers and alliesOrder: PasseriformesFamily: Acrocephalidae

The members of this family are usually rather large for "warblers". Most are rather plain olivaceous brown above with much yellow to beige below. They are usually found in open woodland, reedbeds, or tall grass. The family occurs mostly in southern to western Eurasia and surroundings, but it also ranges far into the Pacific, with some species in Africa.

Booted warbler, Iduna caligata (A)
Melodious warbler, Hippolais polyglotta
Icterine warbler, Hippolais icterina
Aquatic warbler, Acrocephalus paludicola (A)
Moustached warbler, Acrocephalus melanopogon  (A)
Sedge warbler, Acrocephalus schoenobaenus
Paddyfield warbler, Acrocephalus agricola (A)
Blyth's reed warbler, Acrocephalus dumetorum (A)
Marsh warbler, Acrocephalus palustris
Eurasian reed warbler, Acrocephalus scirpaceus
Great reed warbler, Acrocephalus arundinaceus

Grassbirds and alliesOrder: PasseriformesFamily: Locustellidae

Locustellidae are a family of small insectivorous songbirds found mainly in Eurasia, Africa, and the Australian region. They are smallish birds with tails that are usually long and pointed, and tend to be drab brownish or buffy all over.

River warbler, Locustella fluviatilis (A)
Savi's warbler, Locustella luscinoides (A)
Common grasshopper-warbler, Locustella naevia

SwallowsOrder: PasseriformesFamily: Hirundinidae

The family Hirundinidae is adapted to aerial feeding. They have a slender streamlined body, long pointed wings and a short bill with a wide gape. The feet are adapted to perching rather than walking, and the front toes are partially joined at the base.

Bank swallow, Riparia riparia
Eurasian crag-martin, Ptyonoprogne rupestris (A)
Barn swallow, Hirundo rustica
Red-rumped swallow, Hirundo daurica (A)
Common house-martin, Delichon urbicum

Leaf warblersOrder: PasseriformesFamily: Phylloscopidae

Leaf warblers are a family of small insectivorous birds found mostly in Eurasia and ranging into Wallacea and Africa. The species are of various sizes, often green-plumaged above and yellow below, or more subdued with grayish-green to grayish-brown colors.

Wood warbler, Phylloscopus sibilatrix
Western Bonelli's warbler, Phylloscopus bonelli (A)
Yellow-browed warbler, Phylloscopus inornatus (A)
Pallas's leaf warbler, Phylloscopus proregulus (A)
Dusky warbler, Phylloscopus fuscatus (A)
Willow warbler, Phylloscopus trochilus 
Common chiffchaff, Phylloscopus collybita
Greenish warbler, Phylloscopus trochiloides (A)

Bush warblers and alliesOrder: PasseriformesFamily: Scotocercidae

The members of this family are found throughout Africa, Asia, and Polynesia. Their taxonomy is in flux, and some authorities place some genera in other families.

 Cetti's warbler, Cettia cetti (A)

Long-tailed titsOrder: PasseriformesFamily: Aegithalidae

Long-tailed tits are a group of small passerine birds with medium to long tails. They make woven bag nests in trees. Most eat a mixed diet which includes insects.

Long-tailed tit, Aegithalos caudatus

Sylviid warblers, parrotbills, and alliesOrder: PasseriformesFamily: Sylviidae

The family Sylviidae is a group of small insectivorous passerine birds. They mainly occur as breeding species, as the common name implies, in Europe, Asia and, to a lesser extent, Africa. Most are of generally undistinguished appearance, but many have distinctive songs.

Eurasian blackcap, Sylvia atricapilla
Garden warbler, Sylvia borin
Barred warbler, Curruca nisoria (A)
Lesser whitethroat, Curruca curruca
Western Orphean warbler, Curruca hortensis (A)
Sardinian warbler, Curruca melanocephala (A)
Common whitethroat, Curruca communis

KingletsOrder: PasseriformesFamily: Regulidae

The kinglets, also called crests, are a small group of birds often included in the Old World warblers, but frequently given family status because they also resemble the titmice.

Goldcrest, Regulus regulus
Common firecrest, Regulus ignicapillus

WallcreeperOrder: PasseriformesFamily: Tichodromidae

The wallcreeper is a small bird related to the nuthatch family, which has stunning crimson, grey and black plumage.

Wallcreeper, Tichodroma muraria (A)

NuthatchesOrder: PasseriformesFamily: Sittidae

Nuthatches are small woodland birds. They have the unusual ability to climb down trees head first, unlike other birds which can only go upwards. Nuthatches have big heads, short tails and powerful bills and feet.

Eurasian nuthatch, Sitta europaea

TreecreepersOrder: PasseriformesFamily: Certhiidae

Treecreepers are small woodland birds, brown above and white below. They have thin pointed down-curved bills, which they use to extricate insects from bark. They have stiff tail feathers, like woodpeckers, which they use to support themselves on vertical trees.

Eurasian treecreeper, Certhia familiaris
Short-toed treecreeper, Certhia brachydactyla

WrensOrder: PasseriformesFamily: Troglodytidae

The wrens are mainly small and inconspicuous except for their loud songs. These birds have short wings and thin down-turned bills. Several species often hold their tails upright. All are insectivorous.

Eurasian wren, Troglodytes troglodytes

DippersOrder: PasseriformesFamily: Cinclidae

Dippers are a group of perching birds whose habitat includes aquatic environments in the Americas, Europe and Asia. They are named for their bobbing or dipping movements.

White-throated dipper, Cinclus cinclus

StarlingsOrder: PasseriformesFamily: Sturnidae

Starlings are small to medium-sized passerine birds. Their flight is strong and direct and they are very gregarious. Their preferred habitat is fairly open country. They eat insects and fruit. Plumage is typically dark with a metallic sheen.

European starling, Sturnus vulgaris

Thrushes and alliesOrder: PasseriformesFamily: Turdidae

The thrushes are a group of passerine birds that occur mainly in the Old World. They are plump, soft plumaged, small to medium-sized insectivores or sometimes omnivores, often feeding on the ground. Many have attractive songs.

Mistle thrush, Turdus viscivorus
Song thrush, Turdus philomelos
Redwing, Turdus iliacus
Eurasian blackbird, Turdus merula
Fieldfare, Turdus pilaris
Ring ouzel, Turdus torquatus

Old World flycatchersOrder: PasseriformesFamily: Muscicapidae

Old World flycatchers are a large group of small passerine birds native to the Old World. They are mainly small arboreal insectivores. The appearance of these birds is highly varied, but they mostly have weak songs and harsh calls.

Spotted flycatcher, Muscicapa striata
European robin, Erithacus rubecula
Thrush nightingale, Luscinia luscinia (A)
Common nightingale, Luscinia megarhynchos
Bluethroat, Luscinia svevica
Red-breasted flycatcher, Ficedula parva (A)
European pied flycatcher, Ficedula hypoleuca
Collared flycatcher, Ficedula albicollis (A)
Common redstart, Phoenicurus phoenicurus
Black redstart, Phoenicurus ochruros
Rufous-tailed rock-thrush, Monticola saxatilis (A)
Whinchat, Saxicola rubetra
European stonechat, Saxicola rubicola
Northern wheatear, Oenanthe oenanthe

WaxwingsOrder: PasseriformesFamily: Bombycillidae

The waxwings are a group of passerine birds with soft silky plumage and unique red tips to some of the wing feathers. In the Bohemian and cedar waxwings, these tips look like sealing wax and give the group its name. These are arboreal birds of northern forests. They live on insects in summer and berries in winter.

Bohemian waxwing, Bombycilla garrulus

AccentorsOrder: PasseriformesFamily: Prunellidae

The accentors are in the only bird family, Prunellidae, which is completely endemic to the Palearctic. They are small, fairly drab species superficially similar to sparrows.

Alpine accentor, Prunella collaris (A)
Siberian accentor, Prunella montanella (A)
Dunnock, Prunella modularis

Old World sparrowsOrder: PasseriformesFamily: Passeridae

Old World sparrows are small passerine birds. In general, sparrows tend to be small, plump, brown or grey birds with short tails and short powerful beaks. Sparrows are seed eaters, but they also consume small insects.

House sparrow, Passer domesticus
Eurasian tree sparrow, Passer montanus
White-winged snowfinch, Montifringilla nivalis (A)

Wagtails and pipitsOrder: PasseriformesFamily: Motacillidae

Motacillidae is a family of small passerine birds with medium to long tails. They include the wagtails, longclaws and pipits. They are slender, ground feeding insectivores of open country.

Grey wagtail, Motacilla cinerea
Western yellow wagtail, Motacilla flava
Citrine wagtail, Motacilla citreola (A)
White wagtail, Motacilla alba
Richard's pipit, Anthus richardi (A)
Tawny pipit, Anthus campestris
Meadow pipit, Anthus pratensis
Tree pipit, Anthus trivialis
Red-throated pipit, Anthus cervinus (A)
Water pipit, Anthus spinoletta

Finches, euphonias, and alliesOrder: PasseriformesFamily: Fringillidae

Finches are seed-eating passerine birds, that are small to moderately large and have a strong beak, usually conical and in some species very large. All have twelve tail feathers and nine primaries. These birds have a bouncing flight with alternating bouts of flapping and gliding on closed wings, and most sing well.

Common chaffinch, Fringilla coelebs
Brambling, Fringilla montifringilla
Hawfinch, Coccothraustes coccothraustes
Common rosefinch, Carpodacus erythrinus (A)
Eurasian bullfinch, Pyrrhula pyrrhula
European greenfinch, Chloris chloris
Eurasian linnet, Linaria cannabina
Common redpoll, Acanthis flammea
Lesser redpoll, Acanthis cabaret
Red crossbill, Loxia curvirostra
European goldfinch, Carduelis carduelis
European serin, Serinus serinus
Eurasian siskin, Spinus spinus

Longspurs and snow buntingsOrder: PasseriformesFamily: Calcariidae

The Calcariidae are a family of birds that had been traditionally grouped with the New World sparrows, but differ in a number of respects and are usually found in open grassy area

Snow bunting, Plectrophenax nivalis (A)

Old World buntingsOrder: PasseriformesFamily''': Emberizidae

Emberizidae is a family of seed-eating passerine birds with distinctively finch-like bills. In Europe, most species are called buntings. Many emberizid species have distinctive head patterns.

Corn bunting, Emberiza calandraRock bunting, Emberiza cia (A)
Cirl bunting, Emberiza cirlus (A)
Yellowhammer, Emberiza citrinellaOrtolan bunting, Emberiza hortulana (A)
Reed bunting, Emberiza schoeniclusLittle bunting, Emberiza pusilla'' (A)

See also
List of birds
Lists of birds by region

References

 
Lorgé, P. & Ed. Melchior (2018): Les Oiseaux du Grand-Duché de Luxembourg (natur&ëmwelt asbl.)
Lëtzebuerger Natur- a Vulleschutzliga: Checklist of the Birds of Luxemburg

Lists of birds by country
Lists of birds of Europe
Birds
List